The 2017 League of Ireland Cup, known for sponsorship reasons as the 2017 EA Sports Cup, was the 44th season of the League of Ireland's secondary knockout competition. The EA Sports Cup features teams from the SSE Airtricity League Premier and First Divisions, as well as some intermediate level teams.

Teams

Clubs denoted with * received a bye into Second Round

First round
The draw for the First Round took place on 17 February 2017. Ties were scheduled to take place on 21 March 2017 but were postponed due to the sudden death of Derry City captain Ryan McBride. All ties were re-arranged to take place in the first week of April 2017, with the exception of Galway United vs Mayo League (played on 27 March 2017).

Second round
The draw for the Second Round took place on 5 April 2017. The games were scheduled for Easter Monday 17 April 2017.

Quarter-finals
The draw for the quarter finals took place on 19 April 2017 with the ties due to be played on 1 May 2017 and 2 May 2017.

Semi-finals
The draw for the semi-finals were made on 17 May 2017 with the fixtures due to take place on 7 August 2017.

Final

References 

 EA Sports Cup 2017 Fixtures and Results

Cup
3
League of Ireland Cup seasons